Nicolae David (9 August 1915 – 3 December 1977) was a Romanian football midfielder.

International career
Nicolae David played two games at international level for Romania at the 1934–35 Balkan Cup, the first one was a 2–2 against Greece and the second was a 3–2 victory against Bulgaria.

Honours
Mica Brad
Divizia B: 1939–40

Notes

References

External links
Nicolae David at Labtof.ro

1977 deaths
Romania international footballers
Liga I players
Liga II players
1915 births
Romanian footballers
Association football midfielders
FC Universitatea Cluj players